Mauro Maiola (born 24 January 1968) is an Argentine sailor. He competed in the Star event at the 1996 Summer Olympics.

References

External links
 

1968 births
Living people
Argentine male sailors (sport)
Olympic sailors of Argentina
Sailors at the 1996 Summer Olympics – Star
Place of birth missing (living people)